Sajidah "S.K." Ali is an Indian-Canadian author of children's books, best known for her Asian/Pacific American Award-winning debut young adult novel Saints & Misfits, about Janna Yousuf, an Indian-American hijabi who grapples with getting sexually assaulted by a friend's cousin from her local mosque.

Personal life 
Ali was born in South India and immigrated to Canada when she was three. The first language she learned in school was French. She wrote her first story in seventh grade.

She has a degree in Creative Writing from York University. Aside from writing, Ali also works as a teacher and has written articles for the Toronto Star. She mentions Judy Blume as one of her biggest inspirations for her writing career. Ali is a practicing Muslim. In January 2017, she created the hashtag #MuslimShelfSpace as a way to shine light on books by other Muslim authors.

She lives with her family in Toronto.

Ali is friends with fellow writers Ausma Zehanat Khan and Uzma Jalaluddin. Khan told an interviewer that they considered themselves the Sisterhood of the Pen, and appreciated comments as they shared early drafts of their work.

Works

Novels
  Saints and Misfits  (Salaam Reads, 2017)
  Love from A to Z  (Salaam Reads, 2019)
  Misfit in Love  (Salaam Reads, 2021)

Picture books
 The Proudest Blue, co-authored with Ibtihaj Muhammad , illustrated by Hatem Aly (Brown, 2019)

Short stories
 in  Hungry Hearts: 13 Tales of Food & Love (Simon Pulse, 2019)
 Once Upon An Eid: Stories of Hope of Joy by 15 Muslim Voices, edited with Aisha Saeed, co-authored with various including, G. Willow Thompson, Hena Khan, Rukhsana Khan (Amulet Books, 2020)

Awards 
Won

 2017 Asian/Pacific American Award for Young Adult Literature for Saints and Misfits

Nominated

 2018 William C. Morris YA Debut Award for Saints and Misfits

References 

Living people
Women writers of young adult literature
Year of birth missing (living people)
21st-century Indian women writers
21st-century Indian writers
21st-century Canadian women writers
21st-century Indian Muslims
York University alumni
Indian schoolteachers
Canadian schoolteachers